Jean Caudron (15 November 1895 – 23 January 1963) was a Belgian footballer. He competed in the men's tournament at the 1928 Summer Olympics.

References

External links
 
 
 

1895 births
1963 deaths
Belgian footballers
Belgium international footballers
Olympic footballers of Belgium
Footballers at the 1928 Summer Olympics
Footballers from Liège
Association football goalkeepers
R.S.C. Anderlecht players